The Montreal International Auto Show (Le Salon International de l'Auto de Montréal in French) is an annual auto show held for 10 days in mid-to-late January in Montreal, Quebec, Canada. It usually takes place at the Palais des congrès de Montréal.

The Montréal International Auto Show (MIAS) is produced by the Montréal Automobile Dealers Corporation. When it was first launched in 1969, the show's aim was to beef up car sales during a time of the year when business was known to be relatively slow for car dealerships. This event is, after all these years, a much-anticipated annual rite among Montréalers and it is one of the most important events of its type in Canada with an average of more than 200,000 visitors.

The 2014 edition of the MIAS was held at Palais de Congrés from January 17 to January 26 inclusively.

Automakers

United States (Including its Canadian-owned subsidiaries)
General Motors
Buick
Cadillac
Chevrolet
GMC
Chrysler
Chrysler
Dodge
Jeep
Ram
Ford Motor Company
Ford
Lincoln
Saleen
Callaway

United Kingdom
Aston Martin
Bentley (subsidiary of Volkswagen Group)
Jaguar (subsidiary of Tata Motors)
Land Rover(subsidiary of Tata Motors)
Lotus Cars
Mini (subsidiary of BMW)
Rolls-Royce

Sweden
Volvo (subsidiary of Geely)

Italy
Fiat
Fiat
Ferrari 
Maserati
Lamborghini (subsidiary of Volkswagen Group)

Germany
Volkswagen Group
Audi
Volkswagen
BMW
 DaimlerBenz
Maybach
Mercedes-Benz
Smart

South Korea
Hyundai Kia Automotive Group
Hyundai
Kia

Japan
Honda Motor Company
Acura
Honda
Nissan Motors
Infiniti
Nissan
Toyota Motor Corporation
Lexus
Toyota
Mazda
Mitsubishi
Subaru

Vietnam 
 VinFast

References

External links
 The Official Website of the Montreal International Auto Show

Auto shows in Canada
Events in Montreal
Tourist attractions in Montreal
Winter events in Canada